"Tracie" is a song by British band Level 42, written by Gary Husband and Mark King, and recounts King's times with his childhood sweetheart, Tracie Wilson. It appeared on the band's 1988 album Staring at the Sun, and features keyboardist Mike Lindup playing harmonica.

It was remixed for issue as a single in early 1989, upon which it peaked at No. 25 in the UK, and at No. 14 in the Netherlands. The photo of the band on the sleeve of the single is taken by Linda McCartney.

Personnel
Mark King – bass, vocals
Mike Lindup – keyboards, vocals, harmonica
Gary Husband – drums
Alan Murphy – guitars
Wally Badarou – keyboards
Dominic Miller – guitars

References

Level 42 songs
1988 singles
Songs written by Mark King (musician)
1988 songs
Songs written by Gary Husband
Polydor Records singles